Ampondralava is a municipality in Madagascar. It belongs to the district of Ambilobe, which is a part of Diana Region. According to 2001 census the population of Ampondralava was 6381.

Primary and junior level secondary education are available in town. The majority (99%) of the population are farmers.  The most important crops are rice and sugarcane; also cotton is an important agricultural product. Services provide employment for 1% of the population.

References and notes 

Populated places in Diana Region